Khammouane province (Khammouan) (Lao: ຄໍາມ່ວນ) is a province in the center of Laos. Its capital lies at Thakhek.

Many streams flow through the province to join the Mekong River. The vast forests of the Nakai-Nam Theun National Park are an important watershed that feed many Mekong tributaries as well as form the catchment area for Nam Theun 2, the largest hydropower project in Laos. The Xe Bang Fai River, Nam Hinboun River, and the Nam Theun are the main rivers of the province.

Part of the aborted Thakhek-Tan Ap railway would have crossed the province to connect with the North-South Railway at Tân Ấp Railway Station, Quảng Bình province, Vietnam through Mụ Giạ Pass.

Geography
The province is bordered by Bolikhamsai province to the north and northwest, Vietnam to the east, Savannakhet province to the south, and Thailand to the west. Many streams flow through the province to join the Mekong River. The major rivers originating in the mountains of the province are the Xebangfay River ( long), Nam Hinboun, Nam Theun, and Nam Ngum River. Between the Mekong and the Annamite Range, the Khammouane Plateau features gorges, grottoes, jungles, limestone hills, and rivers.

Thakhek, the provincial capital, is on the Mekong River bordering Thailand. The border checkpoint is Nakhon Phanom. The city has many buildings designed in the French colonial architectural style. The Third Thai–Lao Friendship Bridge, opened to traffic on 11 November 2011, spans the Mekong River.

Tham Khonglor Cave (meaning: 'beauty in the dark') is part of the National Protected Forest Area in Hinboun Mountain. Its west entrance is from Ban Khonglor village in Hinboun District, while the east entrance is from Ban Natan village, Nakai District. The Hinboun River flows through the cave perennially. Vang That and Had Xay Luang are the two hanging rock formations in the cave. The cave is approachable along two routes, one from Vientiane along Route 13 to Hinboun District, and the second route is by boat along the Hinboun River.

Protected areas

The province's forest areas consists of three reserve areas. These are the Nakai-Nam Theun National Park, which covers an area of 352,200 ha of the Annamite mountains and the adjacent Nakai Plateau in the provinces of Khammouane and Bolikhamxay, the Hin Namno National Park with an area of 86,229 ha, and the Phou Hin Poun National Biodiversity Conservation Area with an area of 150,000 ha. These forests have many natural caves.

In 1996, Western scientists discovered a rodent in Khammouan representing a mammal family that had been previously known only from fossils. The Laotian rock rat or kha-nyou (Laonastes aenigmamus), also called the "rat-squirrel", was formally described as a new species in 2005. The species was first described in a 2005 article by Paulina Jenkins and coauthors, who considered the animal to be distinct from all living rodents. They placed it in a new family, Laonastidae. It is in the monotypic genus Laonastes.'

Species of mammals, some discovered relatively recently, include the following (Robichaud 2005): saola, giant muntjac, Roosevelt's muntjac, Truong Son muntjac, Indochinese warty pig, Heude's pig, Annamite striped rabbit, Javan rhinoceros (Rhinoceros sondaicus annamiticus), Indochinese tiger, and Asian elephant.

Important bird areas
The 68,125 hectare Hin Nam No (also Hin Namno) Important Bird Area (IBA) is in the Hin Namno NBCA. Its topography features limestone karst outcrops, undulating limestone hills, as well as  valleys. The IBA's habitat is characterized by sparsely vegetated limestone karst, semi-evergreen tropical rain forest, mixed deciduous forest, moist deciduous tropical forest, and wet evergreen forest. Vietnamese crested argus (Rheinardia ocellata) and Austen's brown hornbill (Anorrhinus austeni) are classified as near threatened. The inornate squirrel (Callosciurus inornatus) has been identified as important fauna within the IBA.

The Khammouane IBA is in the Phou Hin Poun NBCA. The topography and habitat are characterized by sparsely vegetated limestone karst, semi-evergreen forest, mixed deciduous forest, as well as non-calcareous substrate. The IBA is notable for supporting the sooty babbler (Stachyris herberti) and a taxon of François' langur (Trachypithecus francoisi).

Demographics
The population of the province according to the 2015 census is 392,052.

Administrative divisions
The province is composed of the following nine districts:

Economy
Thakhek, the provincial capital, is an important centre for trade. Along with Bolikhamsai and Savannakhet provinces, it is one of the main tobacco producing areas of Laos. Part of the province, particularly Yommalath District,  was badly affected by floods caused by heavy rain in July 2011, affecting rice farmland in the district, inundating almost 700 hectares, destroying dozens of fishponds and killing 112 cattle.
There are several major operating mining companies in the province, including Mining Development Economy Corporation mining gypsum in Thakhek District, LAVICO Co. Ltd, which is a Laos-Vietnam joint venture mining gypsum in Xebangfay District, V.S.K. Co. Ltd mining limestone in Thakhek District), and Lao-North Korea Tin Mines mining tin in Hinboun District. Several culinary specialties are also native the province including Kha Nom Phane, a type of rice cake.

Landmarks
That Sikhottabong, also known as Sikhottabong Stupa, is a contemporary of That Inhangin Savannakhet and That Phanom, built in Thailand under the Sikhottabong Empire. The bones of Buddha are said to be consecrated in these temples. King Nanthasene built the stupa for King Soummitham. It was refurbished in the 15th century during the reign by King Saysethathirath. The pinnacle appears in the shape of the banana flower. The stupa is seen on the bank of the Mekong River. Its festival is held during the third lunar month.

The Great Wall, built of stones, starts on the west side of Thakhek. Some sections of the wall are seen in Thakhek also. Its construction is attributed to the period of the Sikhottabong Empire in the 19th century and is now proposed to be preserved as a national heritage site.

Other attractions include: Tad Kham Waterfall (about 52 kilometers from Thakhek District), Tad Nam Khengkam Waterfall (about 37 km to the east of Thakhek District), Wat Pha Sokkhamsene Temple (an old temple near Nongbok District and about 37 km from Thakhek District), and That Thumphavang Stupa (to the north of Nongbok District).

References

Bibliography

 

 
Provinces of Laos
Populated places on the Mekong River